Ricardo Tanturi (27 January 1905 – 24 January 1973) (nickname: El caballero del tango) was a piano player, composer and bandleader (tango musical genre) in Argentina during the Golden Age of tango.

Tanturi's first instrument was the violin, but he later switched to piano. Tanturi started his career in 1924, playing piano at clubs, festivals and radio. Tanturi's great success came in 1939 when he invited Alberto Castillo into the orchestra and they created 37 recordings. In 1943 Castillo left the orchestra, and Enrique Campos joined in his place.

References

External links 
 Ricardo Tanturi Discography (El Recodo Tango)

1905 births
1973 deaths
Argentine tango musicians